Voyle Gilmore (June 14, 1912 – December 19, 1979) was an American record producer and arranger. He was best known for his work with Frank Sinatra and The Kingston Trio on Capitol Records. Gilmore also worked with Judy Garland, Dick Dale, Dean Martin, The Andrews Sisters, Les Paul and Mary Ford, The Four Preps, The Four Freshmen, The Four Seasons, and Holder Newton & The Apes. Gilmore was the producer of the original live tapes used on The Beatles at the Hollywood Bowl.

References

External links
 Voyle Gilmore interview

American record producers
1912 births
1979 deaths
20th-century American businesspeople